Heaven is a 2011 play by Kit Brookman. The play premiered at the Old 505 Theatre, Surry Hills, New South Wales in November 2011.

Plot
When schoolgirl Angela Farnsworth is run over and killed by a van, three school kids, Max, Stewart and Sally, perform a ritual to bring her back.

Production history
Heaven first premiered at the Old 505 Theatre in Surry Hills, New South Wales from November 16th and ran to November 27th, 2011, with Geraldine Hakewill as Angela Farnsworth 

In 2013, Heaven was performed at the La Mama Theatre in Carlton, Victoria, directed by Brookman.

Awards
In 2012, Brookman was awarded the Philip Parsons Young Playwrights Award for Heaven.

References

2011 plays
Australian plays